Marcus Snowell Wright (April 21, 1890 – August 5, 1975) was an American athlete who competed mainly in the pole vault. He was born in Chicago and died in Reading, Massachusetts.

Wright competed for a United States in the 1912 Summer Olympics held in Stockholm, Sweden in the pole vault where he won the silver medal with a clearance of 3.85 m behind the 3.95 m of winner Harry Babcock.

Wright graduated from Dartmouth College in 1913.

References

External links
Profile

1890 births
1975 deaths
American male pole vaulters
Olympic silver medalists for the United States in track and field
Athletes (track and field) at the 1912 Summer Olympics
Dartmouth College alumni
World record setters in athletics (track and field)
Medalists at the 1912 Summer Olympics